Xerogyra grovesiana is a species of air-breathing land snail, a terrestrial pulmonate gastropod mollusk in the family Geomitridae.

Distribution

This species occurs in Italy.

References

External links
 https://www.naturamediterraneo.com/forum/topic.asp?TOPIC_ID=42474
 Paulucci, M. (1881). Contributo alla fauna malacologica italiana. Specie raccolte dal Dott. G. Cavanna negli anni 1878, 1879, 1880, con elenco delle conchiglie Abruzzesi e descrizione di due nuove Succinea. Bullettino della Società Malacologica Italiana. 7: 69-180

Gastropods described in 1881
grovesiana